Bede Amarachi Osuji (born 21 January 1996) is a Nigerian football winger who plays for Koper.

Honours
Gorica
Slovenian Cup: 2013–14

Koper
Slovenian Cup: 2021–22

References

External links
NZS profile 

1996 births
Living people
Nigerian footballers
Association football wingers
Nigerian expatriate footballers
ND Gorica players
NK Brda players
Hapoel Ra'anana A.F.C. players
FC Koper players
Slovenian PrvaLiga players
Slovenian Second League players
Liga Leumit players
Expatriate footballers in Slovenia
Expatriate footballers in Israel
Nigerian expatriate sportspeople in Slovenia
Nigerian expatriate sportspeople in Israel
Place of birth missing (living people)